Ernst-Wolfgang Böckenförde (19 September 1930 – 24 February 2019) was a German legal scholar and a justice on Germany's Federal Constitutional Court. He was a professor at the University of Freiburg and the author of more than 20 books and 80 articles dealing with legal and constitutional theory, as well as political theory, political philosophy and Catholic political thought. Böckenförde was considered a member of the Ritter School.

Life
Böckenförde was born on 19 September 1930 in Kassel. His parents were forester Josef Böckenförde (1894–1962) and his wife Gertrud (née Merrem; 1899–1977). As a child, he attended the Wilhelmsgymnasium in Kassel, where he passed his Abitur.

Böckenförde received a PhD in law in Münster in 1956, for a dissertation he wrote under the supervision of Hans Julius Wolff. He also received a PhD in history in 1960 from the University of Munich for a thesis supervised by Franz Schnabel. In 1964 he completed his postdoctoral habilitation with a thesis titled The power of organisation in the purview of the government. A survey of constitutional law in the Federal Republic of Germany. He became Professor of Public Law, Constitutional History, Legal History and Philosophy of Law at the University of Heidelberg in the same year. In 1969, he moved to the University of Bielefeld, and in 1977 to the University of Freiburg, where he remained until his retirement.

Böckenförde served as a member of the second senate of the Federal Constitutional Court from 1983 until 1996. Into his tenure fall several path-breaking decisions for the Federal Republic of Germany, including decisions pertaining to the deployment of missiles, the law of political parties, and the legal regulation of abortion.

Böckenförde was a member of the Social Democratic Party of Germany (SPD) since 1967. He was also a practising Catholic. From 1971 until 1976 Böckenförde was a member of the Special Parliamentary Commission of Inquiry on Constitutional Reform.

Böckenförde received numerous awards for his academic and public service commitments, among them honorary doctorates from the Faculties of Catholic Theology of the University of Bochum (1999) and the University of Tübingen (2005), and from the Law Schools of Bielefeld University (1999), the University of Münster (2001) and the University of Basel (1987).

A sentence from a 1964 article of his caused decades of discussion in German and European political thought. It became known as the Böckenförde dilemma: "The liberal secular state lives on premises that it cannot itself guarantee."

Böckenförde last lived in Au near Freiburg, where he died on 24 February 2019, aged 88.

Writings (English translation)
 Ernst-Wolfgang Böckenförde (1991): State, Society, and Liberty: Studies in Political Theory and Constitutional Law. Berg, New York.
 "Carl Schmitt Revisited". Telos 109 (Fall 1996). New York: Telos Press.
 "The Concept of the Political as the Key to Understanding Carl Schmitt’s Constitutional Theory", in The Canadian Journal of Law and Jurisprudence, January 1997, Vol. 10, 5. (Translated by Heiner Bielefeldt from "Der Begriff des Politischen als Schlüssel zum staatsrechtlichen Werk Carl Schmitts (1988)").
 Constitutional and Political Theory: Selected Writings, edited by Mirjam Künkler and Tine Stein, Oxford University Press 2017, .
 Religion, Law, and Democracy: Selected Writings, edited by Mirjam Künkler and Tine Stein, Oxford University Press 2021, .

References

20th-century German judges
People from Hesse-Nassau
Justices of the Federal Constitutional Court
1930 births
2019 deaths
People from Kassel
Academic staff of Bielefeld University
German scholars of constitutional law
German Roman Catholics
Grand Crosses with Star and Sash of the Order of Merit of the Federal Republic of Germany
Recipients of the Order of Merit of Baden-Württemberg